XHCVC-FM is a radio station on 106.9 FM in Cuernavaca, Morelos. It is owned by Grupo Fórmula and carries its news and talk programming.

History
XHCVC received its concession on March 26, 1993. It was owned by Irene Abigail Moreno Cobar. Radio Fórmula acquired the station in 2006.

References

External links
Radio Formula Morelos Facebook

Radio stations in Morelos
Radio Fórmula